Ali Jarbawi (born January 30, 1954) is the former Minister of Planning and Administrative Development and the former Minister of Higher Education of the Government of the Palestinian National Authority.
 
Prior to this appointment he worked in government as a special adviser to the Prime Minister Salam Fayyad and supervised the preparation of the Palestinian Reform and Development Plan 2008-10 (PRDP). He was General Director of the Palestinian Independent Center for Citizens’ Rights from 1997 to 2000, and worked as Secretary General and Executive Director of the Central Elections’ Commission from 2002 to 2004.

Academic career
Dr. Jarbawi joined the Faculty of Political Science at Birzeit University in 1981, after receiving his PhD in Political Science from the University of Cincinnati, and was awarded Professorship in 1996. He has held a variety of senior posts at Birzeit University: including Dean of the Faculty of Law and Public Administration, Dean of Students’ Affairs, Director of the Ibrahim Abu Loghod Institute for International Studies, Director of the Center for Researches and Studies, and Head of Middle East Department.

Dr. Jarbawi also holds two master's degrees, in public administration and in political science, and a bachelor's degree in sociology.

Published Writings (Partial List)
 Overcoming the Crisis: Towards a new Palestinian Strategy (Ramallah: Ibrahim Abu-Lughod Institute of International Studies, 2001)
 Toward an Electoral System for the Democratic State of Palestine, co-author, (Ramallah: Muwatin, 2001)
 Teaching Human Rights: A Manual for School Teachers (Jerusalem: UNRWA Publications, 2001)
 The Legal Structure and Democratic Transformation in Palestine (Ramallah: Muwatin, 1999).
 "Building the Institutions of Civil Society in Palestine", in The Palestinian Situation Thirty Years After 1967 (Amman: Abdel-Hamid Shuman Foundation, 1998).
 "Civil Society in Palestine: The Need for a Reassessment", in Civil Society and Democratic Transformation in Palestine (Ramallah: Muwatin, 1995).
 What Type of Local Government Do We Need? The Palestinian Case (Nablus: PCSR, 1996).
 Critical Review of the Palestinian Developmental Experience (Ramallah: Palestinian Studies Project, 1991).
 The Palestinian Universities: A Critical Review (Jerusalem: Arab Studies Society, 1986).

References

External links
 Official site of the Ministry of Planning
 The Palestinian Reform and Development Plan(PRDP), 2008–2010
 Who are the members of the Palestinian new cabinet?, Maan News Agency.

1954 births
Living people
People from Jenin
Academic staff of Birzeit University
University of Cincinnati alumni
Government ministers of the Palestinian National Authority
Government ministers of the State of Palestine